Coscojahuarina (possibly from Quechua qusqu boundary stone; nucleus; navel; heap of earth and stones; bed, dry bed of a lake, Qusqu Cusco (a city), qhawarina, qhawana viewpoint) is a mountain in the eastern extensions of the Urubamba mountain range in the Andes of Peru, about  high. It is located in the Cusco Region, Calca Province, Calca District. It lies southeast of Huamanchoque and Pitusiray.

References 

Mountains of Peru
Mountains of Cusco Region